Ramesh a/l Lai Ban Huat (born 8 April 1980 in Perak) is a Malaysian footballer who plays for Kuching City. He is of Chindian descent.

Malaysia Super League 2012

References

External links
 

Malaysian footballers
Living people
1980 births
Malaysian people of Chinese descent
Malaysian people of Indian descent
People from Perak
Malacca FA players
Kuala Lumpur City F.C. players
Sarawak FA players
Kuching City F.C. players
Malaysia Premier League players
Malaysia Super League players
Association football defenders